Sybra arator is a species of beetle in the family Cerambycidae. It was described by Pascoe in 1865. It is known from Malaysia, Singapore, and Sumatra.

References

arator
Beetles described in 1865